Magzhan Zhumabayev (romanized: Mağjan Jūmabaev), (25 June 1893 – 19 March 1938) was a Kazakh poet and writer who revolutionized the Kazakh language.

Biography

He was born in 1893 into a Kazakh Muslim family in modern-day Astana and was given the name Muhammedjan Jumabayev at birth. For much of his childhood, Muhammedjan was exposed to Islamic poetry as his family was deeply religious.  In his teenage years, he shortened his name from "Muhammedjan" to "Magjan".  From 1905 until 1910, Muhammedjan (or Magjan hereafter) Jumabayev studied in a madrasah in the town of Petropavl, where he learned the Arabic, Turkish, and Persian languages.  In 1911, He moved away from his home town and attended a madrasah in the city of Ufa, where he learned under the Volga Tatar classical writer Ğalimcan İbrahimof. In 1912 he began writing Kazakh poetry with the pen name "Şolpan".  His poetry was written in the Kazakh language, which used the Arabic alphabet at the time.  Within just a year, Magjan's works became highly popular among Kazakh intellectuals.

During the summer and winter of 1917 he began taking part in the creation of Kazakh "Alash" party and Alaş Orda, a coalition of Kazakh nationalists who wanted a new national government that promoted Islam and was independent from their Russian overlords.  Magjan was present at both All-Kazakh congresses as a delegate of Akmolinsk Oblast.

Magjan moved back and forth between Petropavl and Ufa before finally settling in the Russian capital of Moscow.  While living there, he translated the works of Lermontov, Koltsov, Balmont, Merezhkovsky, Ivanov, Mamin-Sibiriak, Maksim Gorky, Alexander Blok, Goethe, Heine and other poets into Arabic, Kazakh, Turkish, and Persian.  After finishing his higher education in 1927, he returned to his hometown in Kazakhstan to work as teacher.

Arrest
Because of the unfair accusation of being a Pan-Turkist member of Alaş Orda and a Japanese spy, Jumabayev was arrested in Petropavl and convicted for the 10-year deprivation of liberty. Until his court date he had been staying in Butyrka prison, and later was sent to Karelia and Arkhangelsk Oblast.  In 1934 Maksim Gorky and Peshkova received a letter from him and due to their intervention Magjan Jumabayev was emancipated before the appointed time. However, just half a year later he was arrested in Almaty again and executed by shooting of NKVD on 19 March 1938.

Legacy
Streets in Astana, Almaty, Kokshetau and Petropavlovsk are named after the poet.

On May 28, 2013, the National Bank of Kazakhstan issued a commemorative coin in honor of the 120th anniversary of Magzhan Zhumabayev.

On February 21, 2018, a monument to Magzhan Zhumabayev was unveiled in Ankara.

On June 24, 2018, a monument was unveiled in Petropavlovsk in honor of the 125th anniversary of the great writer, poet Magzhan Zhumabayev. The author is the Kazakh sculptor Edige Rakhmadiev.

On June 25, 2018, Kazpost issued commemorative postage stamps for the 125th anniversary of the poet.

Films
 1990 — "Мағжан»" Mağjan  (Documentary) "Kazakhtelefilm" film director Kalila Umarov.

Documentaries
 2019 — "Mağjan Cumabay" Köklerin İzinde  (Documentary) TRT Avaz.

References 

1893 births
1938 deaths
Kazakh-language writers
Great Purge victims from Kazakhstan
People from Akmola Region
Executed Kazakhstani people